The Irrawaddy Bridge (Yadanabon) (also Ayeyarwady Bridge, Yadanabon Bridge,  Yadanar Pone Bridge or New Ava Bridge) is a bridge in Mandalay, Myanmar. It crosses the Irrawaddy River, to the southwest of Mandalay and Amarapura and just to the north of the old Ava Bridge, and is also known as the New Ava Bridge. It was completed in 2008.

Location
The Yadanabon Bridge spans the Irrawaddy River (Ayeyarwady River) in the Mandalay suburb connects with Sagaing City. The bridge (also known as Ayeyawady Bridge) is the gateway to Yangon, Mandalay and interior other regions. Nearby on the river banks are two 12th century payas known as Shwe-kyet-yet and Shwe-kyet-kya.

History
Built by the British in 1934, until the 1990s, it was the only bridge which spanned this river. The Ava had aged, and its carrying capacity became limited to under 15-ton capacity trucks since 1992. Heavily laden vehicles crossed the river with Z-craft ferries, resulting in less efficient transportation of goods.

To ease the traffic congestion and to help improve the overall economic conditions of Burma, a new bridge was planned by the government. International tender was invited in early 2002 for ts construction. The tender for the highway bridge envisaged planning, design and construction. The bidding process lasted eight months, and the work was awarded to China CAMC Engineering Cc., Ltd. in October 2002. The contract was signed in Rangoon for a tendered amount of US$10.90 million on 19 November 2002. (By 2004, 35 bridges were under construction in Burma, along with the Irrawaddy of Yadanabon.) The new bridge was opened on 11 April 2008.

Features

Irrawaddy Bridge was built by the Public Works of the Ministry of Construction. It is designed for a carrying capacity of 60 tons. The bridge is a flexible beam structure with three rigid arches of 224 meters each.

The Thiri Mangala overpass above the railway crossing (which used to hold up traffic) involved a reinforced concrete bridge of  length with a two-lane motorway with a carrying capacity of 60 tons. It is designed to provide a clearance of  width and  height to pass the trains.

References

Bibliography

Bridges in Myanmar
Buildings and structures in Mandalay Region
Bridges completed in 2008